The Searchers Play the System – Rarities, Oddities & Flipsides, commonly abbreviated to Play the System, is the compilation album featuring a selection of songs by English band the Searchers. The album was originally released as part of the Searchers collection on PRT Records, a set containing all original Searchers recordings released between 1963-1967 in the UK on Pye Records. It is also the only album gathering together mostly self-penned tunes by the Searchers.

Overview
When all of the Searchers' UK sixties albums were being reissued in 1987 (on LPs, CDs and cassette tapes), PRT Records decided to make two-disc compilation album set originally released as two separate volumes. The set compiles every song released commercially by the band that was not available on their original UK albums. The hits featured on the album named Hits Collection. On the other hand, Play the System was conceived to include lesser-known songs, 18 tracks, including mainly B-sides of their singles, three non-LP A-sides, and the odd 1964 EP-only cut "The System", which was used in a 1964 film of the same name.

Track listing

Personnel
The Searchers
 Mike Pender – lead guitar, lead vocals, backing vocals (1-20)
 John McNally – rhythm guitar, lead and backing vocals (1-20)
 Tony Jackson – bass guitar, lead and backing vocals (1-4)
 Chris Curtis – drums, lead and backing vocals (1-9, 20)
 Frank Allen – bass guitar, lead and backing vocals (5-20)
 John Blunt – drums (10-19)
Additional musicians and production
 Tony Hatch – producer, piano (1-20)

References

1987 compilation albums
The Searchers (band) albums